Félix Louis Leullier (1811 – 1882 in Paris) was a French painter who painted mostly religious subjects.  He studied under the Romantic artist Antoine-Jean Gros.

References

External links 
Profile on Art Renewal Centre

1811 births
1882 deaths
19th-century French painters
French male painters
Pupils of Antoine-Jean Gros
Burials at Père Lachaise Cemetery
19th-century French male artists